Tristan Michael Blackmon (born August 12, 1996) is an American professional soccer player who plays as a right-back for Major League Soccer club Vancouver Whitecaps FC.

Early life
He attended Bishop Gorman High School in Summerlin, Nevada, a suburb of Las Vegas.

College career
Blackmon played his college career at University of the Pacific where he played mainly as a defender after starting as a forward. Blackmon played 70 matches for the Tigers, starting 68. He scored 16 goals and had nine assists. Blackmon finished his collegiate soccer career as the Tigers' all-time goal scoring leader, until Camden Riley broke his record one year later.

Amateur career
Blackmon played for Premier Development League sides Orange County SC U-23 and Burlingame Dragons.

Professional career
On January 19, 2018, Los Angeles FC selected Blackmon with the third overall pick of the 2018 MLS SuperDraft. He signed with the club on February 22, 2018. Blackmon made his professional debut on March 4, 2018, as an 80th-minute substitute during a 1–0 win over Seattle Sounders FC. On May 24, 2019, at Banc of California Stadium, in a 4–2 win over the Montreal Impact, Blackmon scored his first professional goal on a header in the fifty-fifth minute.

On December 14, 2021, Blackmon was selected by Charlotte FC in the 2021 MLS Expansion Draft, before being immediately traded to Vancouver Whitecaps FC in exchange for $475,000 of General Allocation Money.

On July 26, 2022, Blackmon scored the winning penalty kick against Toronto FC in the Canadian Championship Final.

Career statistics

Club

Honors
Los Angeles FC
Supporters' Shield: 2019

Vancouver Whitecaps
Canadian Championship: 2022

References

Living people
1996 births
American soccer players
Association football defenders
Pacific Tigers men's soccer players
Orange County SC U-23 players
Burlingame Dragons FC players
Los Angeles FC players
Phoenix Rising FC players
Vancouver Whitecaps FC players
Los Angeles FC draft picks
Soccer players from Las Vegas
Sportspeople from Las Vegas
USL League Two players
Major League Soccer players